Where Do You Go may refer to:

 "Where Do You Go" (Cher song)
 "Where Do You Go" (La Bouche song), also covered by No Mercy
 "Where Do You Go", a song by Bryan Rice from Confessional
 "Where Do You Go?", a song by Frank Sinatra from No One Cares

See also 
 "Where Do You Go To (My Lovely)?", a song by Peter Sarstedt